The 18th century was a period of rapid growth for London, reflecting an increasing national population, the early stirrings of the Industrial Revolution, and London's role at the centre of the evolving British Empire. By the end of the century nearly one million people lived in London, about one tenth of the population of Great Britain. By 1715, London's population reached an estimated 630,000 people, roughly equaling that of Europe's largest city until that time, Paris. Within a few years London itself was the largest city in Europe, reaching 750,000 people by 1760 and 1 million by the end of the century.

Extent and population 
London's growth in the 18th century was marked above all by the westward shift of the population away from the City of London. Westminster was intensively developed, with new districts like Mayfair housing Britain's wealthiest aristocratic families. To the north of Oxford Street, the building of Cavendish Square in 1717 on the estate of Lord Harley inaugurated the development of the eastern half of Marylebone, while the Portman Estate, which occupies the western half of Marylebone, began its own building program in the 1750s with the granting of commercial leases, followed by the commencement of building on Portman Square in 1764.

The most exclusive area, Mayfair, was intensively built up with luxury townhouses on an area occupied by seven different estates: the Grosvenor, Burlington, Berkeley, Curzon, Milfield, Conduit Mead, and Albemarle Ground estates. The Grosvenor estate, in the northwest corner between Oxford Street and Park Lane, was the most substantial private plot of land, featuring an orderly grid network of streets constructed around Grosvenor Square in the early 1720s. By 1738 "nearly the whole space between Piccadilly and Oxford Street was covered with buildings as far as Tyburn Lane [Park Lane], except in the south-western corner about Berkeley Square and Mayfair".

Rural villages surrounding Westminster and the City also grew in population and were gradually incorporated into the metropolis: areas like Bethnal Green and Shadwell to the east, or Paddington and St Pancras to the northwest. In 1750 the London topographer John Noorthouck reckoned that London proper consisted of 46 former villages, two cities (Westminster and the City of London proper), and one borough (Southwark). Westminster had a population of 162,077, the City 116,755, and Southwark 61,169.

Urban fabric
To accommodate the rapid growth of population, Parliament enacted building legislation and initiated important infrastructure projects. The New Road running between Paddington and Islington was constructed beginning in 1756. With the completion of Westminster Bridge in 1750, London gained a much needed second overland crossing into the South Bank. In 1761 the seven ancient gates enclosing the City of London were removed to improve the circulation of traffic, as was the dense warren of housing on London Bridge which was a perennial fire hazard.

Landmark legislation included the Westminster Paving Act of 1765, which required streets be equipped with pavements, drainage, and lighting. The success of the legislation inspired the London Paving and Lighting Act of 1766, which extended the same provisions across the whole city and required that houses be numbered and streets and pavements be cleansed and swept regularly. Street lighting was more extensive than in any other city in Europe, something which amazed foreign visitors to the capital in the late 18th century. The single most impactful piece of legislation for the aesthetic appearance of the capital was the Building Act of 1777, which set building requirements for new housing and sought to eliminate rampant jerry-building and shoddy construction work. Housing was divided into four "rates" based on ground rents, with each of the rates accorded their own strict building codes. The Building Act accounts for the remarkable uniformity of Georgian terraced housing and squares in London built in subsequent decades, which critics like John Summerson criticized for their "inexpressible monotony".

In 1708 Christopher Wren's masterpiece, St. Paul's Cathedral was completed on his birthday. The first service had been held on 2 December 1697, more than 10 years earlier. This cathedral replaced the original St. Paul's, which had been completely destroyed in the Great Fire of London. This building is considered one of the finest in Britain and a fine example of Baroque architecture.

A phenomenon of 18th-century London was the coffee house, which became a popular place to debate ideas. Growing literacy and the development of the printing press meant that news became widely available. Fleet Street became the centre of the embryonic British press during the century.

The Bow Street Runners were established in 1749 as a professional police force, whilst from 1798 a Marine Police Force tackled crime in the docks and Pool of London. Penalties for crime were harsh, with the death penalty being applied for fairly minor crimes. Public hangings were common in London, and were popular public events.

In 1780, London was rocked by the Gordon Riots, an uprising by Protestants against Roman Catholic emancipation led by Lord George Gordon. Severe damage was caused to Catholic churches and homes, and 285 rioters were killed.

See also
 George III
 William Pitt the Younger
 Kingdom of Great Britain
 East India Company
 Thirteen Colonies
 Colony of Jamaica
 Great Britain in the Seven Years' War
 British North America
 United Empire Loyalist
 History of Australia (1788–1850)
 Timeline of 18th century London

References

Further reading

Published in the 18th century
 
 
 
  + index
 .  + v.2, v.3 (Middlesex); v.4 (Herts, Essex & Kent)

Published in the 20th century

Published in the 21st century

External links

London Lives - A database hosting digital copies of Archival materials from 18th century London